Monica Di Fonzo is a Swiss former football striker and current manager who played for FC Sursee in the Nationalliga A and SC Freiburg in the German Bundesliga, taking part in the UEFA Women's Cup with the former. Named Swiss Footballer of the Year in 2002, she was a member of the Swiss national team.

References

1977 births
Living people
Swiss women's footballers
Expatriate women's footballers in Germany
Switzerland women's international footballers
Women's association football forwards
Frauen-Bundesliga players
Swiss expatriate women's footballers
Swiss expatriate sportspeople in Germany
Swiss football managers
SC Freiburg (women) players